Acharya Jagadish Chandra Bose College is a public undergraduate degree college in Kolkata, West Bengal.

History

It is named after Jagadish Chandra Bose and is affiliated to the University of Calcutta. Until 1 July 1987, the college was known as Birla College of Science and Education. Located near the central part of the city,  the college has science, arts, commerce and education (B.Ed.) streams.

See also 
 Jagadish Chandra Bose
 Bose Institute
List of colleges affiliated to the University of Calcutta
Education in India
Education in West Bengal

References

External links

 Acharya Jagadish Chandra Bose College Website Official Site
 Website Standards

Academic institutions associated with the Bengal Renaissance
University of Calcutta affiliates
Universities and colleges in Kolkata
Educational institutions established in 1968
1968 establishments in West Bengal